Carlos Pau y Español (1857, Segorbe, Spain – 1937, Segorbe) was a Spanish botanist.

References

External links

 Pau y Español, Carlos on plants.jstor.org

1857 births
1937 deaths
People from Segorbe
19th-century Spanish botanists
20th-century Spanish botanists